Karl Joni Seldahl (born Wollter 12 June 1975) is a Swedish film and theatre director and former child actor. 

He was born in Gothenburg. He is the son of Sven Wollter and Viveka Seldahl. He studied at Dramatiska Institutet.

References

External links

Swedish film directors
Living people
People from Gothenburg
1975 births
Swedish male child actors
Dramatiska Institutet alumni